Creary is a surname. Notable people with the surname include:

Andre Creary (born 1990), Jamaican cricketer 
Mitch Creary (born 1976), Australian rugby league footballer

See also
Cleary (surname)
Crear
McCreary